Pak In-chol (born 16 May 1981) is a North Korean former footballer. He represented North Korea on at least five occasions in 2003.

Career statistics

International

References

1981 births
Living people
North Korean footballers
North Korea international footballers
Association football defenders